Rembrandt Harmenszoon van Rijn (1606–1669) is one of the most famous artists in history.<ref>
Golahny, Amy (2001), 'The Use and Misuse of Rembrandt: An Overview of Popular Reception,'. Dutch Crossing: Journal of Low Countries Studies 25(2): 305–322
{{cite web|url=https://www.cecilbdemille.com/legacy/ |author=Cecil B. De Mille Foundation |title=The Legacy of Cecil B. DeMille |work=Cecil B. De Mille Foundation (cecilbdemille.com) |quote="In ''The Film Dailys biographical sketches of directors (July 1, 1928), DeMille was already being credited with “the first developments in lighting and photography.” While shooting The Warrens of Virginia (1915), DeMille had experimented with lighting instruments borrowed from a Los Angeles Opera House. When business partner Sam Goldwyn saw a scene in which only half an actor's face was illuminated, he feared the exhibitors would pay only half the price for the picture. DeMille remonstrated that it was Rembrandt lighting. “Sam's reply was jubilant with relief,” recalled DeMille. “For Rembrandt lighting the exhibitors would pay double!”" |access-date=1 November 2018 }}
Rivette, Kevin G.; Kline, David: Rembrandts in the Attic: Unlocking the Hidden Value of Patents. (Boston: Harvard Business School Press, 1999)
Sax, Joseph L.: Playing Darts with a Rembrandt: Public and Private Rights in Cultural Treasures. (Ann Arbor: University of Michigan Press, 1999)
Laszlo, Andrew; Quicke, Andrew: Every Frame a Rembrandt: Art and Practice of Cinematography. (Boston: Focal Press, 2000)
Amore, Anthony; Mashberg, Tom: Stealing Rembrandts: The Untold Stories of Notorious Art Heists. (New York: Palgrave Macmillan, 2012)
Bush, George W.: Portraits of Courage: A Commander in Chief's Tribute to America's Warriors. (New York: Crown Publishers, 2017), p. 12. In George W. Bush's own words, "I told Laura and our artist friend Pam Nelson that I might like to take up painting. They were surprised — I had been an art-agnostic all my life. Laura said, “You ought to try it.” It seemed like she was slightly skeptical. Pam suggested I hire her friend Gail Norfleet, a notable and talented Dallas artist, as my instructor. Several days later, Gail came over to the house and asked me what my objectives were. “Gail, there's a Rembrandt trapped in this body,” I told her. “Your job is to liberate him.”"</ref> 

The following is a list of things named after Rembrandt.

Arts
Rembrandtesque
Rembrandt lighting
Rembrandt Research Project
Rembrandt House Museum
Rembrandt Award

Places, buildings, structures, and monuments
Rembrandtplein, Amsterdam
Rembrandtpark, Amsterdam
Rembrandt, Iowa, USA
Rembrandt Tower, Amsterdam
Rembrandt Hall, Keeseville, New York
Rembrandt Gardens, Tampa, Florida
Rembrandt Garden, City of Westminster, London
The Rembrandt Hotel, London
The Rembrandt, 31 Jane Street, Manhattan, New York
Rembrandt Street, Petervale, Sandton, Gauteng, South Africa
Rembrandt Park, Johannesburg, Gauteng, South Africa
Rembrandt Ridge, Johannesburg, Gauteng, South Africa
Rembrandt Street, Carlingford, New South Wales, Australia
Rembrandt Road, Cape Town, Western Cape, South Africa
Avenue Rembrandt, Côte-Saint-Luc, Quebec, Canada
Rue Rembrandt, Paris, France
Rembrandt Hotel, Bangkok, Thailand
Rembrandt's Restaurant and Bar, Fairmount, Philadelphia

Other uses
Rembrandt (crater), an impact basin on Mercury
Rembrandt (horse), an Olympic-level dressage horse
Rembrandt (train), a European train service launched in 1967
SS Rembrandt, a 1959-built ocean liner (1997–2003)
S/V Rembrandt van Rĳn, a 1924-built tall ship (since 1995)
Rembrandt toothpaste, an American dental cosmetics line 
Rembrandt Films, an American production company founded by William L. Snyder
Rembrandt Group, officially known as Rembrandt Trust Limited, a South African tobacco and industrial company founded by Anton Rupert
Rembrandt Enterprises, Inc., also known as Rembrandt Foods, an American company based in Okoboji, Iowa
The Rembrandts, an American pop-rock band
Z7 Operation Rembrandt, a 1966 German-Italian-Spanish film
Rembrandt Institute for Cardiovascular Science, a Dutch scientific collaboration
REMBRANDT (REpository for Molecular BRAin Neoplasia DaT'''a), a cancer clinical genomics database and a Web-based data mining

See also
Rembrandt Peale
Rembrandt Bugatti
Rembrandt C. Robinson
Rembrandt Brown
Giovanni Battista Piranesi, dubbed "the Rembrandt of architecture"
Milton Caniff, dubbed "the Rembrandt of the comic strip"
Thomas Carlyle, dubbed "the Rembrandt of English prose"
Cultural depictions of Rembrandt
List of works about Rembrandt

References

Rembrandt
Rembrandt